Upland Unified School District is a school district located in San Bernardino County, California that serves the community of Upland, California. It has a total population of approximately 63,800 and covers a total area of 24 square miles.

History
Just prior to the City of Upland's growth spurt in the 1960s, Upland High School was established in 1955. By the 1980s this population growth had the side-effect of overcrowding, which in turn caused students to transfer to other high schools in the Chaffey Joint Union High School District. The affected families then began a movement towards unifying the existing elementary and middle schools into a separate district. Superintendent George Renworth promoted this movement and the Upland Unified School District was established in 1986. Upland High School has been a part of the district since it left the Chaffey Joint Union High School District in 1988.

Schools
The Upland Unified School District is a K-12 district. It has ten elementary schools, two junior high schools, and two high schools. One of the high schools is a continuation school. The district enrolled approximately 11,200 students in the 2007–2008 school year. All of the schools are located in Upland, California.

Elementary schools
 Baldy View Elementary School
 Cabrillo Elementary School
 Citrus Elementary School
 Foothill Knolls Stem Academy of Innovation
 Magnolia Elementary School
 Pepper Tree Elementary School
 Sierra Vista Elementary School
 Sycamore Elementary School
 Upland Elementary School
 Valencia Elementary School

Junior high schools
 Pioneer Junior High School
 Upland Junior High School
 Foothill Knolls Stem Academy of Innovation

High schools
 Upland High School

Continuation high schools
 Hillside High School

References

External links
 

School districts in San Bernardino County, California
School districts established in 1986
1986 establishments in California